Atoyac (Nahuatl: "place by the river") may refer to any of the following locations in Mexico:

Atoyac, Jalisco
Atoyac, Veracruz
Atoyac de Álvarez, Guerrero
San Pedro Atoyac, Oaxaca
A stretch of the Río Balsas is known as the Río Atoyac